Lü Yuanyang (born June 22, 1983 in Sichuan) is a Chinese rhythmic gymnast. She represented China at the 2004 Summer Olympics, where she placed 6th in the Group All-Around.

She represented China at the 2008 Summer Olympics and won a silver medal in the group competition.

References
 

1983 births
Living people
Chinese rhythmic gymnasts
Gymnasts at the 2004 Summer Olympics
Gymnasts at the 2008 Summer Olympics
Olympic gymnasts of China
Olympic silver medalists for China
Gymnasts from Sichuan
Olympic medalists in gymnastics
Medalists at the 2008 Summer Olympics
21st-century Chinese women